The Mansfield Metropolitan Statistical Area, as defined by the United States Census Bureau, is an area consisting of one county – Richland – in north central Ohio, anchored by the city of Mansfield. As of the 2010 census, the MSA had a population of 124,475.

History
The Mansfield metropolitan area was first defined in 1971. Then known as the Mansfield Standard Metropolitan Statistical Area (Mansfield SMSA), it consisted of a single county – Richland – and had a population of 129,997 in the 1970 census. By the census of 1980, the population had grown to 131,205. In 1983, the official name was shortened to the Mansfield Metropolitan Statistical Area (Mansfield MSA), which is still in use to date. The population had declined to 126,137 in 1990. By the census of 2000, the population had grown to 128,852.

Crawford County was added to the MSA in 1999. The two-county area had 175,818 residents in 2000. In 2003, Crawford County was removed from the Mansfield metropolitan area and was re-designated as the Bucyrus Micropolitan Statistical Area (Bucyrus μSA).

Communities

Cities
Crestline (partial)
Galion (partial)
Mansfield (Principal city)
Ontario
Shelby

Villages
Bellville
Butler
Lexington
Lucas
Plymouth (partial)
Shiloh

Unincorporated places
Olivesburg

Townships

Combined Statistical Area

The Mansfield–Bucyrus Combined Statistical Area is made up of two counties in northwest Ohio. The statistical area includes one metropolitan area and one micropolitan area. As of the 2000 Census, the CSA had a population of 175,818 (though a July 1, 2009 estimate placed the population at 167,893).

Metropolitan Statistical Areas (MSAs)
Mansfield (Richland County)
Micropolitan Statistical Areas (μSAs)
Bucyrus (Crawford County)

See also
Ohio census statistical areas

References

Richland County, Ohio
Metropolitan areas of Ohio
Mansfield, Ohio